Jaap Davids (born 1 December 1984 in Bergharen, Gelderland) is a Dutch footballer.

Club career
His first club was Vitesse in the 2003–04 and 2004–05 season, but made no appearances for the club.  He was loaned out to FC Den Bosch in 2005, where he made 34 appearances and 5 goals. The next season Davids was loaned out to AGOVV Apeldoorn making three appearances and where he was suspended for a few months due to ill-discipline.

He was finally released by Vitesse and joined amateur side De Treffers.

In 2009 he moved to FC Lienden, only to leave them after two seasons for RKHVV.

Statistics

References

1984 births
Living people
People from Wijchen
Association football defenders
Dutch footballers
FC Den Bosch players
AGOVV Apeldoorn players
De Treffers players
FC Lienden players
Footballers from Gelderland